The Pecos Valley Southern Railway  is a short-line railroad headquartered in Pecos, Texas, United States.

PVS operates a  line from Saragosa to an interchange with Union Pacific at Pecos.  The line generally parallels State Highway 17. The railroad's traffic consists mainly of crude oil, sand, gravel, and barite ore.

History 
The line was opened on May 1, 1910, between Pecos and Toyahvale (a distance of ).  The segment between Toyahvale and Saragosa was abandoned in 1971.

From 1927 to 1946, the railroad was controlled by the Texas and Pacific Railroad (now part of Union Pacific). The railroad was popular with tourists who rode trains from Pecos to San Solomon Springs (now Balmorhea State Park).

On September 1, 2012, the Pecos Valley Southern Railroad (PVSR) began operating as a subsidiary of Watco Transportation Services, LLC, under a long-term lease agreement reached with PVSR.

References

Bibliography

External links 
Union Pacific PVS Profile
https://web.archive.org/web/20150714122644/https://www.watcocompanies.com/our-services/rail-services/pvs/

Texas railroads
Transportation in Reeves County, Texas
Railway lines opened in 1910
Pecos, Texas